Brimus affinis is a species of beetle in the family Cerambycidae. It was described by Stephan von Breuning in 1971. It is known from Mozambique.

References

Endemic fauna of Mozambique
Phrissomini
Beetles described in 1971